Shadow Work is the second solo album by American heavy metal vocalist Warrel Dane from Nevermore and Sanctuary, released on October 26, 2018. Recordings for Shadow Work, the follow-up to 2008's Praises to the War Machine, started in fall 2017 at Orra Meu Studio, São Paulo, but after Dane's death on December 13, 2017, recordings stopped. After reviewing the material that could actually be completed using vocals from various studio and pre-production sessions with Dane, the decision was made to release his final recordings as Shadow Work.

Track listing

"Ethereal Blessing" - 1:12
"Madame Satan" - 4:37
"Disconnection System" - 6:01
"As Fast as the Others" - 4:42
"Shadow Work" - 4:13
"The Hanging Garden" (The Cure) - 5:52
"Rain" - 5:41
"Mother Is the Word for God" - 9:32

Credits
Warrel Dane - vocals
Johnny Moraes - Guitars
Thiago Oliveira - Guitars
Fabio Carito - Bass
Marcus Dotta - Drums

Additional personnel
Travis Smith - album cover
Wagner Meirinho - production
Lasse Lammert - editing, reamping,  mixing, mastering

References

External links
Century Media - Shadow Work

2018 albums
Warrel Dane albums
Century Media Records albums